Last of the Summer Wine's nineteenth series aired on BBC One. All of the episodes were written by Roy Clarke and produced and directed by Alan J. W. Bell.

Outline
The trio in this series consisted of:

First appearances
Truly Truelove (1997–2010)

List of episodes
Christmas Special (1997)

Regular series

DVD release
The box set for series nineteen was released by Universal Playback in February 2011, mislabelled as a box set for series 19 & 20.

References

Last of the Summer Wine series
1998 British television seasons